Vulcan Iron Works was the name of several iron foundries in both England and the United States during the Industrial Revolution and, in one case, lasting until the mid-20th century. Vulcan, the Roman god of fire and smithery, was a popular namesake for these foundries.

England
During the Industrial Revolution, numerous entrepreneurs independently founded factories named Vulcan Iron Works in England, notably that of Robinson Thwaites and Edward Carbutt at Bradford, and that of Thomas Clunes at Worcester, England. The largest of all the ironworks of Victorian England, the Cleveland Works of Bolckow Vaughan in Middlesbrough, were on Vulcan Street.

Thwaites & Carbutt, Bradford

The Vulcan Works at Thornton Road, Bradford was a spacious and handsome factory. It was described in Industries of Yorkshire as

Ley's, Derby

The Vulcan Iron Works at Osmaston Road, Derby was founded in 1874 by Francis Ley (1846-1916). On a site occupying 11 acres by the Birmingham and Derby Junction Railway, he manufactured castings for motor cars. The company became the Ley's Malleable Castings Company Ltd. In the London Gazette of April 14, 1876, Ley was granted a patent for "improvements in apparatus for locking and fastening nuts on fish plate and other bolts". The iron foundry was closed and demolished in 1986.

McKenzie, Clunes & Holland, Worcester

The Vulcan Iron Works at Cromwell Street, Worcester was founded in 1857 by Thomas Clunes (b. 1818, d. 28 September 1879). The firm started out as "Engineers, Millwrights, Iron & Brass Founders, Plumbers etc", according to the listing in Kelly's Directory. The works had a single tall tapering square chimney, a covered area with open sides, and a handsome main building on a largely open site on the west side of the Worcester and Birmingham Canal.

By 1861, Clunes, a former "Plumber and Brass Founder" from Aberdeen, Scotland living in St Martin's, Worcester, with nine children, was a "Master Engineer employing 104 men and 10 boys"; his son Robert at age 11 was an "Apprentice to Engineer". In 1861, Clunes was joined by two former railwaymen, McKenzie and Holland, and the firm moved into railway signalling equipment. Clunes retired to Fowey, Cornwall, and his name was dropped from the company's name in the 1870s. The entry in the Worcestershire Post Office Directory for 1876 is simply "RAILWAY SIGNAL MANFRS. McKenzie & Holland, Vulcan Iron Works, Worcester."

Vulcan Foundry, Newton-le-Willows

The Vulcan Foundry at Newton-le-Willows produced ironwork for the Liverpool and Manchester Railway, as well as locomotives.

Vulcan Iron Works, Langley Mill

The G R Turner company's Vulcan Iron Works at Langley Mill, Derbyshire was built in 1874. GR Turner produced railway rolling stock until the 1960s; at its peak it employed 350 men. According to Grace's Guide, G R Turner was established in 1863; it became a Limited Company in 1902, and was registered on 29 January 1903 as acquiring T N Turner's business of "engineer, wheel and wagon maker"; in 1914 it was described as "Colliery Engineers" as well as making rolling stock, with 800 engineers.

Vulcan Ironworks, Preston

In 1857 the firm of Baxendale and Gregson was founded in Shepherd Street, Preston, Lancashire. When the works there became too small, the business moved to a new Vulcan Ironworks, built at Salter Street, just off North Road, Preston, under the name Gregson and Monk.

In 1873, James Gregson bought 82 acres of land at Fulwood; in 1876 he built Highgate Park mansion with the land as its extensive gardens. He owned much property in Preston and was a councillor of Fulwood District. His son George Frederick Gregson ran the firm after him.

When Monk retired in March 1874, James Gregson became sole proprietor. He employed about 400 men, making up to 100 weaving looms per week. Over 25,000 looms made by Gregson were claimed to be at work in or near Preston in 1884.

The machines made by the firm included:

The ironworks was reported in 1884 to have grindstones of 7 ft (2 metre) diameter; "two cupolas blown by fans, one of which is capable of melting twenty tons of metal per day"; cranes and hoists; a brass moulding shop; a sand mill (for the mouldings); and a machine for grinding coal to dust. The buildings included a draughtsmen's office; a pattern makers' and joiners' shop; a packing room; an erecting and turning shop; and a smithy. All the machines were driven by rope from a single large wheel; two horizontal steam engines powered the entire ironworks. The journalist noted that "The death rate among grinders is very high indeed, which it is almost impossible to prevent."

United States

Wilkes-Barre, Pennsylvania

Vulcan Iron Works, based in Wilkes-Barre, Pennsylvania, manufactured railroad locomotives such as those shown in the illustration. The company was established in 1849 by Richard Jones. It built locomotives such as the preserved Berlin Mills Railway 7 (1911), and by 1944 was constructing both steam and diesel locomotives, as illustrated (right). The company ceased operation in 1954, and its assets were acquired by General Industrial Locomotive Corp.

War-time service
In February 1944, before the 'D-Day' Normandy landings, the company claimed

Today, hundreds of Vulcan locomotives are rendering vitally important war-time service, both at home and overseas, and our shops are working at top speed to complete urgent orders for Army, Navy and defense plant requirements. Tomorrow, more and larger Vulcan locomotives will be available to help rebuild a war-torn world. Our manufacturing facilities are being enlarged and improved ....

Locomotives
Vulcan produced a wide variety of steam locomotives, mostly small but some with up to eight driving wheels. With the advent of internal combustion technology, the firm began producing small locomotives fueled not only with gasoline, but also benzine, alcohol, kerosene and naptha.  Vulcan produced its first diesel locomotives in the 1920s; a total of 54 diesel-electric switcher units (each weighing  or more) came out of Vulcan's shops between 1938 and 1954. Its largest unit was a  B-B unit built for Carnegie Steel Company in 1944. It also constructed the TCDD 56301 Class for the Turkish State Railways in 1947.

Vulcan built a large number of gasoline-powered locomotives with a mechanical drive, such as the Maumelle Ordnance Works Locomotive 1, built in 1942.

Seattle

The Vulcan Iron Works in Seattle had Jacob Furth as its president. Furth ran the Vulcan Iron Works along with the Puget Sound Electric Railway and street railways on the Puget Sound.

San Francisco
A Vulcan Iron Works was established at 135 Fremont Street, San Francisco in 1850 during the California gold rush.  The factory occupied the block bounded by Fremont, Mission, Howard, and First Streets.  The factory maintained the name through a number of owners building boilers, steam engines, mining machinery, sawmills, and some relatively primitive steam locomotives for 19th century California railroads. It built the Oregon Pony in 1861. The factory was destroyed by the 1906 San Francisco earthquake, but steel fabrication activities resumed on the site after the quake.

Charleston
There was a Vulcan Iron Works on Cumberland Street, Charleston, South Carolina in 1865.

See also
 Vulcan (motor vehicles)

References

External links
 Preserved Vulcan Iron Works steam locomotive list
 Photograph of Vulcan Iron Works Worcester steel at Shrub Hill station
 Photograph of Gregson and Monk Engineers, Salter Street, Preston
 Photograph of a Gregson and Monk power loom
 Photograph of James Gregson's Highgate Park mansion, Preston in 1900
 Photograph of a grate, cast by Vulcan Iron Works San Francisco
 Finding Aid for Vulcan Iron Works collection at Hagley Library

Industrial machine manufacturers
History of Worcester, England
Foundries in the United States
Defunct locomotive manufacturers of the United States
Ironworks and steel mills in the United States
Industrial buildings in England
Foundries in the United Kingdom
Buildings and structures destroyed in the 1906 San Francisco earthquake